Malatia-Sebastia, also nicknamed colloquially as Bangladesh, is one of the 12 districts of Yerevan, the capital of Armenia, located in the western part of the city. As of the 2011 census, the district has a population of 132,900.

Malatia-Sebastia is bordered by the Ajapnyak District form the north, Kentron District from the east and Shengavit District from the south. It also has borders with the Armavir Province from the east and the Ararat Province from the southeast.

The name of the community is derived from two former major historically partly Armenian towns in modern-day Turkey; Malatya and Sivas.

The district is unofficially divided into smaller neighborhoods such as: Nor Malatia, Zoravar Andranik, Shahumyan, Araratyan and Haghtanak.

History
In 1925, Western Armenian genocide survivors from the historic city of Malatya (today in Turkey) founded the new settlement of Malatia to the west of Yerevan city centre. Two years later, the settlement of Sebastia was built at the north of Malatia, mainly by genocide survivors from the historic city of Sebastia. In the 1940s, with the expansion of the city of Yerevan, the settlements of Malatia and Sebastia and the surrounding settlements became part of the capital city. In 1945, Malatia and Sebastia were connected to central Yerevan with the Victory Bridge and the Admiral Isakov Avenue.

In 1996, Malatia and Sebastia were merged into one district called Malatia-Sebastia, to become one of the 12 districts of Yerevan.

The district is home to the Sebastia Silk Factory and the RAO MARS Metal Factory. Zvartnots International Airport is in the outskirts of Malatia-Sebastia, to the southwest of the district.

Streets and landmarks

Main streets
Admiral Isakov Avenue.
Raffi street.
Sebastia street.
Tichina street.
Arno Babajanian street.
Zoravar Andranik street.
Daniel Varujan street.
Gusan Sheram street.

Landmarks
Church of the Holy Mother of God of Malatia.
Holy Trinity Church
Yerablur military cemetery and the Holy Martyrs Vartanants chapel
Holy Cross Russian Orthodox Church (under construction)
Patriotic War Memorial Park
Youth Park
Vahan Zatikyan Park
Malatia Garden
Maternity Park
Love and Faith Park
Chinar Garden
Yuri Bakhshyan Park
Italian Park
Armenicum Center
Mkhitar Sebastatsi Educational Complex
Khoren and Shooshanig Avedisian School
Banants Training Centre
Urartu Stadium
Yerevan Velodrome cycling circuit
Dalma Garden Mall

Gallery

References

Districts of Yerevan